Arabic Extended-B is a Unicode block encoding Qur'anic annotations and letter variants used for various non-Arabic languages. The block also includes currency symbols and an abbreviation mark.

Block

History 
The following Unicode-related documents record the purpose and process of defining specific characters in the Arabic Extended-B block:

References 

Unicode blocks